Body and the Beat is the seventh studio album recorded by Australian-New Zealand rock band, Dragon. The album was released in June 1984 and peaked at number 5 on the Australian Kent Music Report. The album was certified gold in the week of release and achieved platinum status in Australia. It was the band's first studio album since Power Play in 1979.

Although Dragon had reformed with the "classic" 1970s line-up which had produced the group's biggest hits of the previous decade, this album saw some line-up changes: the addition of second keyboard player Alan Mansfield and the substitution of Terry Chambers for Kerry Jacobson. Paul Hewson, who had been responsible for many of the band's hits, was unwilling or unable to contribute extensively to songwriting, and instead Todd Hunter, who had always contributed to Dragon's repertoire but had not been key to its chart success, contributed the majority of the album's hits with his partner Johanna Pigott. Between the demise and revival of Dragon, Pigott and Hunter had been members of, and songwriting contributors to, the group XL Capris. Robert Taylor's song "Magic" was also released as a single from the album, Taylor's third single A-side with the group after the much earlier "Education" (1975) and "Wait Until Tomorrow" (1976).

At the 1984 Countdown Music Awards, Body and the Beat was nominated for Best Australian Album.

Track listing
Side one
"Rain" (Johanna Pigott, Marc Hunter, Todd Hunter) – 3:39                                                                                                   
"Promises" (Johanna Pigott, Marc Hunter, Todd Hunter) – 4:11
"Wilderworld" (Johanna Pigott, Marc Hunter, Todd Hunter) – 3:51
"Cry" (Todd Hunter) – 3:44
"Cool Down" (Alan Mansfield, Todd Hunter) – 4:21

Side two
"Body and the Beat" (Marc Hunter, Robert Taylor) – 4:26
"Witnessing" (Marc Hunter, Todd Hunter) – 4:39
"Magic" (Robert Taylor) – 3:57
"What Am I Gonna Do?" (Alan Mansfield, Kerry Jacobson, Robert Taylor, Paul Hewson, Todd Hunter) – 3:41
"Fool" (Johanna Pigott, Todd Hunter) – 3:31

Personnel
 Robert Taylor – guitar, vocals
 Alan Mansfield – keyboards, guitar, vocals
 Paul Hewson – keyboards, vocals
 Marc Hunter – lead vocals
 Terry Chambers – drums
 Todd Hunter – bass guitar, vocals
uncredited:
 Kerry Jacobson – drums on "Rain"
Production
 Produced by Alan Mansfield (tracks 1 and 8) and Carey Taylor (tracks 2–7, 9, 10)

Charts

Certifications

References

Dragon (band) albums
1984 albums
Polydor Records albums